The United Muslim American Association is an organization in Illinois for the purpose of empowering Muslims through the political process. It was founded by Rafiq Jaber.

See also
Rafiq Jaber

References

Islamic political organizations